Utpal Bhadra a retired scientist, worked in the Centre for Cellular and Molecular Biology (CCMB) in Hyderabad, India. Bhadra is known for his work on RNA interference, and is a Fellow of the Royal Society of Biology and a Fellow of the Royal Society of Chemistry in the United Kingdom.

Bhadra, along with his wife, Manika Pal Bhadra, and Jim Birchler of the University of Missouri, proved in 1997 that gene silencing occurs in animal systems. His work published in the journal Science was in the top ten ranking for papers for three consecutive years.

Education and research career

Early life and education

Bhadra was born and raised in a small village in the periphery of Sunderbans, West Bengal, India. His father Late Kalipada Bhadra was an Assistant Head Master of the village school. Bhadra completed his primary education from the village High School in Hingalganj. Due to absence of a scope for further education in his village, he completed his schooling until class twelve from his sister's place in Asansol. He pursued his bachelor's degree from the Presidency College in Zoology, Chemistry and Botany which he completed in 1980.

References

Further reading
 http://www.thehindu.com/sci-tech/health/targeting-drugs-to-diseased-heart-shows-promise/article6959498.ece
 http://www.livemint.com/Industry/dhiSkSOFz7PHGWCiilNv7N/Indian-scientist-tries-to-modify-8216gene-silencing8217.html
 http://www.thehindu.com/sci-tech/health/novel-molecule-for-cancer-therapy/article7855585.ece

Fellows of the Royal Society of Biology
Fellows of the Royal Society of Chemistry
Indian biochemists
Living people
Year of birth missing (living people)